Ignition Records is a British, London based independent record company, owned by Marcus Russell and Alec McKinlay of Ignition Management. The company has been releasing music on a regular basis since the late 1990s, although its inaugural release came in September 1984 with Latin Quarter's single, "Radio Africa". The label is distributed by The Orchard.

Throughout the last two decades it has signed and released music of both emerging and established artists.

The company also provides comprehensive label services to various established artists to release on their own label imprints e.g. Stereophonics, Primal Scream.

Ignition Records is also the primary label services and marketing operation for Big Brother Recordings and Sour Mash Records, which are also based at Ignition Records headquarters in Marylebone, London, England.

Artists released by Ignition Records

Compilation albums 
Fire & Skill: The Songs of the Jam

Affiliated labels
Big Brother Recordings
Sour Mash Records

Sister companies
Ignition Music: Independent music publisher
Ignition Management

References

External links
Ignition Records website

British record labels